

Track listing
 "Skanda's Tail" - 8:07
 "Mezmorized" - 8:34
 "Telementery" - 8:46
 "Karmic Implications" - 7:13
 "Language Of Silence" - 9:08
 "Raspy Honks" - 8:33
 "Colonization" - 8:33
 "Witch Doctor" - 8:07
 "Earth Tremors" - 6:23

Personnel
Paul McCosh

2002 albums
Fractal Glider albums